Spektr-M (Russian: Спектр-M) is a proposed Russian scientific satellite with a  sub-millimeter to far infrared space telescope. It is designed to be a successor to the Herschel Space Observatory, covering similar wave bands, and to look into chemical evolution in the universe, black hole horizon radiation, and dark energy investigation. Spacecraft design documentation and prototyping is currently underway and expected to continue until 2023. Due to budget cuts in 2019, launch is not expected until 2030.

Overview 
The purpose of this mission is to study the universe in millimeter to far infra-red wavelengths. The instruments are to be cooled with liquid helium to 4.5K for part of the mission, but sun shields will allow it to continue in a degraded mode once the coolant evaporates.

It will be placed in a halo orbit around the Sun–Earth  Lagrangian point.

References

External links 

 Millimetron site
 Popular Mechanics (RU)

Space telescopes
2020s in spaceflight
2020s in Russia
Infrared telescopes
Satellites of Russia
Roscosmos
Proposed spacecraft